The Aimaq Hazara (Hazara-e qala-e naw); are the Aimaq's subtribe of Hazara origin, however, they are Sunni Muslims while most other Hazaras are Shia Muslims. The Aimaq Hazara and Timuri are the most Mongoloid of the Aimaqs. Some of the Aimaq Hazara and Timuri are semi-nomadic and live in yurts covered with felt.

See also 
 Aimaq people
 List of Hazara tribes

References

Further reading

External links
Ethnologue.com
Nativeplanet.org
Central Asian Cultural Intelligence for Military Operations Aimaq of Afghanistan

Aymaq
Hazara people
Hazara tribes
Modern nomads